Lieke Klaver (born 20 August 1998) is a Dutch track and field athlete who specializes in sprint races. She finished fourth in the 400 metres at the 2022 World Athletics Championships. Klaver claimed the silver medal for the event at the 2023 European Indoor Championships. She won five major medals as part of the Dutch 4 × 400 m relays.

She represented Netherlands at the 2020 Tokyo Olympics.

Career
Lieke Klaver represented Netherlands at the 2019 World Athletics Championships, competing in the women's 4 × 400 metres relay.

She represented Netherlands at the 2020 Summer Olympics, competing in the women's 400 metres and both the women's and mixed 4 × 400 metres relays.

In February 2022, at the Dutch Indoor Championships, she set a new personal best for the 400 metres in a time of 51.20 seconds. During the summer season Klaver lowered greatly her outdoor pre-2022 best (50.98 s) down to 50.18 seconds at the World Championships in Eugene, Oregon, finishing fourth in the final.

In February 2023, at the Dutch Indoors in the 400 m race in which compatriot Femke Bol set a world record of 49.26 s, Klaver massively lowered by nearly 0.7 s her lifetime indoor best down to 50.34 s, putting her 13th on the respective world all-time list. Only two-time Olympic champion, Shaunae Miller-Uibo of the Bahamas, and Bol had run faster indoors since 2007. The following month, Klaver won her first individual major medal, with silver for the 400 m at the European Indoor Championships held in Istanbul.

Competition record

Personal bests
 60 metres indoor – 7.41 (Apeldoorn 2020)
 100 metres – 11.46 (+0.5 m/s, Oordegem, Lede 2019)
 200 metres – 22.66 (+1.3 m/s, La Chaux-de-Fonds 2020)
 200 metres indoor – 22.97 (Metz 2023)
 400 metres – 50.18 (Eugene, OR 2022)
 400 metres indoor – 50.34 (Apeldoorn 2023)
Relays
 4 × 400 metres relay – 3:20.87 (Munich 2022) 
 4 × 400 metres relay indoor – 3:25.66 (Istanbul 2023) 
 4 × 400 metres relay mixed – 3:09.90 (Eugene, OR 2022)

Notes

References

External links

 

Dutch female middle-distance runners
1998 births
Living people
World Athletics Championships athletes for the Netherlands
People from Velsen
European Athletics Indoor Championships winners
Athletes (track and field) at the 2020 Summer Olympics
Olympic athletes of the Netherlands
World Athletics Indoor Championships medalists
21st-century Dutch women
Sportspeople from North Holland
European Athletics Championships winners